Live & Well is a live album by The Gap Band, released in 1996. The songs "Gotta Get Up" and "Drop the Bomb" are both special live versions of "Early in the Morning" and "You Dropped a Bomb on Me" with similar instrumentations but modified lyrics.

Track listing

References
[ Allmusic]
Discogs

External links
 
 Live And Well at Discogs
 Facebook Page
 Myspace Page
 Encyclopedia of Oklahoma History and Culture - Gap Band
 The Gap Band at WhoSampled
 Charlie Wilson in-depth interview by Pete Lewis, 'Blues & Soul' August 2011
 Charlie Wilson 2011 Interview at Soulinterviews.com

The Gap Band albums
1996 live albums